Vinodol Channel ( or ) is a channel between the island of Krk and the Croatian coastline proceeding past Jadranovo, Dramalj, and Crkvenica to Novi Vinodolski.

Landforms of Croatia
Adriatic Sea
Channels of the Mediterranean Sea
Landforms of Primorje-Gorski Kotar County
Channels of Europe